Mariana Grajales Airport  is an airport serving Guantánamo, a city in Cuba. It is located near the villages of Paraguay and Las Lajas. The airport is named after Mariana Grajales Cuello.

Construction
The runway was built during World War II by the US Navy as a reserve airfield for the US Guantanamo Bay Naval Base. Up to the 60s was known as "Los Caños" aerodrome.

Airlines and destinations

Facilities

References

External links
 
 

Airports in Cuba
Buildings and structures in Guantánamo
Buildings and structures in Guantánamo Province